Petrúcio Ferreira dos Santos (born 18 November 1996) is a Paralympic sprinter from Brazil. He competed in three events at the 2016 Summer Paralympics and won a gold or a silver medal in each of them. In the individual 100 m sprint he broke the world record both in the preliminaries and in the final.

References

External links
 

1996 births
Living people
Brazilian male sprinters
Paralympic athletes of Brazil
Athletes (track and field) at the 2016 Summer Paralympics
Paralympic gold medalists for Brazil
Paralympic silver medalists for Brazil
Medalists at the 2016 Summer Paralympics
World Para Athletics Championships winners
Paralympic medalists in athletics (track and field)
Medalists at the 2015 Parapan American Games
Medalists at the 2019 Parapan American Games
Athletes (track and field) at the 2020 Summer Paralympics
21st-century Brazilian people